Damnica  (formerly ) is a village in Słupsk County, Pomeranian Voivodeship, in northern Poland. It is the seat of the gmina (administrative district) called Gmina Damnica.

The village has a population of 1,240.

References

Damnica

it:Damnica